The  are a professional baseball team in the Japanese Central League. Their home field is Yokohama Stadium, located in central Yokohama. The team has been known by several names since becoming a professional team in 1950. It adopted its current name in 2011, when the club was purchased by software company DeNA.

History

Origin (1930s–1949)
The team began as the Taiyo Fishing Company, an amateur team currently affiliated with the Maruha Corporation (presently Maruha Nichiro). The team began to appear in national tournaments in the 1930s, and won the National Sports Festival in 1948, giving it national recognition. In the 1949 off-season, the Japanese professional baseball league drastically expanded itself and many players from the Taiyo amateur team were recruited to join the professional leagues. The owner of the Taiyo company decided to join the newly expanded Central League, which was established in 1950. The team's first professional incarnation was as the Maruha Team. The franchise was based in Shimonoseki, Yamaguchi.

Taiyo Whales (1950–1952)
The team name was changed to the  shortly after the start of the 1950 season. The Whales received several veteran players from the Yomiuri Giants to compensate for their lack of players, but ended up in the bottom half of the standings each year.

In 1951, there was talk of merging with the Hiroshima Carp, which had experienced serious financial problems but the merging never occurred due to massive protests from Hiroshima citizens.

Taiyo Shochiku Robins (1953) and Yo-Sho Robins (1954)
In 1952, it was decided that teams ending the season with a winning percentage below .300 would be disbanded or merged with other teams. However, the team's re-organization was not completed in time for the 1953 season, and the team ended up continuing its offices in both Shimonoseki and Kyoto.

The Shochiku Robins had won the 1950 Central League championship before being merged.

Taiyo Whales (1955–1977)
The Shochiku company discontinued its support in December, 1954, and the team name returned to the Taiyo Whales. The franchise moved to Kawasaki, Kanagawa, and obtained an exclusive home field, (Kawasaki Stadium), but ended up in last place six years in a row from 1954–1959.

In 1960, the team recruited Osamu Mihara, who had been manager of the Nishitetsu Lions the previous year. Mihara led the team to its first pennant in 1960, and swept the Pacific League champions in the Japanese championship series. The team had been in last place the previous year.

However, this success did not last long, and the team quickly fell back into last place in 1961. The Whales made a comeback in 1962, but trailed four games behind the Hanshin Tigers to end up in second place. They lost the league championship again to the Tigers in 1964, only one game (.008 winning percentage) away from first place.

The team produced countless star players during the 1970s, but rarely ended the season above the .500 mark. The small Kawasaki Stadium made the Whales one of the most offensively productive teams in Japanese baseball history, but a weak pitching staff, and lack of financial support put the team out of serious contention.

By 1976, the team had been planning on moving from Kawasaki to Yokohama, and support from the mayor of Yokohama allowed the team to gain financial support from the Kokudo Company. 55% of the team's share was retained by Taiyo, and the other 45% went to Kokudo.

Yokohama Taiyo Whales (1978–1992)
In 1978, the team moved to the newly-completed Yokohama Stadium in central Yokohama. The Kokudo Company sold its shares of the team to the Nippon Broadcasting System and TBS. The Nippon Broadcasting System obtained 30% of the shares, and TBS bought 15%, while Taiyo kept its 55%. The team enjoyed far more popularity during this period than in previous years, but continued to post only meager results in the standings, with their best placing being in 1979, when they finished second behind the Hiroshima Toyo Carp.

Yokohama BayStars (1993–2011)
The BayStars were the first Japanese professional baseball team not to include the name of the parent company in the team name.

Originally, the team was going to be renamed simply to the Yokohama Whales, but new restrictions on whaling in Japan convinced the company to drop the original name. Some superstitious fans had believed that dead whales put a curse onto the team (the Maruha Corporation was famous for its whale meat products), preventing the Whales from winning championships. In his visit to the United States, Japanese Prime Minister Kiichi Miyazawa remarked to the then-president Bill Clinton (who had proposed the international restriction on whaling) that the Maruha Corporation's decision was reflective of Japan's change in attitude towards whaling.

The BayStars remained a non-contender during the early 1990s, but gradually assembled the players that would contribute to the team's championship in 1998. Akihiko Ohya became the manager in 1996, and almost caught up to the Yakult Swallows in 1997, ending in second place. Hiroshi Gondo (a pitching coach the previous year) became manager in 1998, and the BayStars won their first league championship in 38 years in 1998, defeating the Seibu Lions to win the Japanese championship series. The team's consistent hitting, impeccable defense, (players from the BayStars won five golden glove awards in 1998) and solid pitching staff (rounded by closer Kazuhiro Sasaki) contributed to an epic 1998 season.  The BayStars' offense in the '98 season became known as the "Machine Gun Offense" because of the quick succession of hits the Yokohama batters would get (mostly singles), and no game was ever over until the final out was recorded.

The team dropped to third place in 1999 despite having the best offense in Japan and also setting a league record for team batting average at .294, and has not been in serious contention for the championship ever since. In 2001, the Maruha Corporation sold its remaining shares to TBS, giving TBS full ownership of the team, with the only stipulation being that TBS was not allowed to put their name in the team's name. Akihiko Ohya returned in 2007 after leaving the team in 1997. In 2009 the team  finished at the bottom of the league despite having a few young stars on the team like slugger Shuichi Murata and league batting champion Seiichi Uchikawa, and also having the pitching of Daisuke Miura and the signing of foreign star Ryan Glynn.

On May 18, 2009, The BayStars' management announced it had fired Ohya and appointed Tomio Tashiro as an acting manager.

Yokohama DeNA BayStars (2012–present)
In 2011, the franchise was acquired by a mobile telephone game company DeNA. The name was changed to reflect this, and they changed their mascot from Hosshey to Starman, who wore the new uniform.

In October 2015, Alex Ramírez, a former BayStars player and the only foreign-born player to have 2,000 hits in Japanese baseball, was named as manager for the 2016 season. He replaced Kiyoshi Nakahata, who resigned at the end of 2015 to take responsibility for the club's poor performance. In 2016, Yokohama DeNA BayStars finished the regular season in third place (69–71–3), 19.5 games behind the league leader Hiroshima Toyo Carp (89–52–3). Defeating the second place Yomiuri Giants two games to one in the first stage of the Climax Series, the BayStars advanced to the Climax Series Final but lost to the Carp in five games.

In 2017, the BayStars again finished the regular season in third place (73–65–5) 14.5 games behind the league leader Hiroshima Toyo Carp (88–51–4). Their .252 team batting average and 134 home runs were both second best in the Central League. In the first round of the Climax Series, the BayStars defeated the second place Hanshin Tigers in three games and advanced to the Climax Series Final. Although losing the first game against the Hiroshima Toyo Carp, the BayStars won  the next four games to become 2017 Central League Climax Series Champions for the first time in 19 years.  José López was the most valuable player (MVP) of the Central League Climax Series. The BayStars advanced to the 2017 Japan Series against the Pacific League Champion Fukuoka Softbank Hawks. The Hawks won the first three games of the series. Facing elimination, the BayStars won Games 4 and 5. At home in game 6, with the BayStars leading 3-2, the Hawks' Seiichi Uchikawa hit a game-tying solo home run off of the BayStars' star closer, Yasuaki Yamasaki. Keizo Kawashima hit the walk-off RBI single for SoftBank in the eleventh inning for the title. Hawks' pitcher Dennis Sarfate, with two saves and a Game 6 win, was named the Japan Series Most Valuable Player (MVP). Toshiro Miyazaki won the Fighting Spirit Award, given to the best player on the losing team. It was the first Japan Series loss for the team.

Season-by-season records

Roster

Former players
  – P (秋山登: 1956–1967)
  – 1B, OF (近藤和彦: 1958-1972)
  – 1B (松原誠: 1962–1980)
  – P (平松政次: 1967–1984)
  – 1B, OF (中塚政幸: 1968–1982)
  – 2B (ジョン・シピン: 1972–1977)
  – OF, 1B (高木義和: 1972–1987)
  – OF (長崎慶一: 1973–1984)
  – SS, 2B, 3B (山下大輔: 1974–1987)
  – 3B, 1B, OF (田代富雄: 1976–1991)
  – 2B, 1B (フェリクス・ミヤーン: 1978–1980)
  – P (斉藤明夫: 1977–1993)
  – P (遠藤一彦: 1978–1992)
  – CF (屋鋪要: 1978–1993)
  – 2B, SS, 3B (基満男: 1979–1984)
 - 2B, SS (高木豊: 1981–1993) 
 - OF (山崎賢一: 1981–1993)
  – OF (ジム・トレイシー: 1983–1984)
  – 3B (レオン・リー: 1983–1985)
  – LF (加藤博一: 1983–1990) 
  - P (欠端光則: 1984–1994)
  – 1B (カルロス・ポンセ: 1986–1990)
  – P (新浦壽夫: 1987–1991) 
 - P (デニー友利, デニー: 1987–1996, 2003-2004)
  – 1B, LF (ジム・パチョレック: 1988–1991)
  – SS, 3B (進藤達哉: 1988–2000)
  – P (野村弘樹: 1988–2002)
  – C (谷繁元信: 1989–2001)
  – SS, 3B, P (石井琢朗: 1989–2008)
  – P (佐々木主浩: 1990–1999, 2004–2005) 
  – OF (鈴木尚典: 1991–2008) 
  – OF (R.J.レイノルズ: 1991–1992)
  – P (斎藤隆: 1992–2005) 
  – P (三浦大輔: 1992–2016) 
  – P (五十嵐英樹: 1991–2001)
  – RF (グレン・グラッグス: 1993–1996)
  – 2B (ロバート・ローズ: 1993–2000)
   – 1B,OF(佐伯貴弘: 1993–2010)
  – P (大家友和: 1994–1998,2010–2011)
  – 1B (駒田徳広: 1994–2000)
  – CF (波留敏夫: 1994–2001)
  – C (相川亮二:1995–2008) 
  – P (福盛和男: 1995-2003)
  – P (川村丈夫:1997–2008) 
  – OF (金城龍彦:1999-2014)
  – P (木塚敦志:2000–2010)
  – 2B (種田仁:2001–2007)
  – 1B,OF (内川聖一:2001–2010)
  – 3B (村田修一: 2003–2011)
  – RF (吉村裕基: 2003–2012)
  – 1B (タイロン・ウッズ:2003–2004)
  – P (門倉健:2004–2006)
  – P (マーク・クルーン: 2005–2007)
  – P (スティーブン・ランドルフ: 2009–2010,2011)
  – 1B (ブレット・ハーパー: 2010–2011) 
  – 3B (中村紀洋: 2011–2014) 
  – OF (アレックス・ラミレス: 2012–2013)
  – 1B (トニ・ブランコ: 2013–2014)

Retired numbers
None

Honored numbers

MLB Players 
Former:
Yuli Gurriel (2014-2015)
Tomo Ohka (1999–2009)
Takashi Saito (2006–2012)
Kazuhiro Sasaki (2000–2005)
Denney Tomori (2005)
Yoshitomo Tsutsugo (2010-2019)
Joe Stanka (1966)

Mascots

They have been represented by various star-themed characters such as:
 Hosshey (ホッシ) 1993–2012
 Hossiena (ホッシーナ) 1993-2012
 Hossiso (ホッシーゾ) 1993-2012
 DB.Starman (DB.スターマン) 2012~
 DB.Kirara (DB.キララ) (DB Starman`s daughter) 2012~
 DB.Rider 2012~2017

Minor League Team 
The Baystars farm team plays in the Eastern League. It was founded in 1950. The minor league team shares the same name and uniform as the parent team and they play the majority of their home games at Yokosuka Stadium, located in Yokosuka, Kanagawa.

See also
Tokyo Broadcasting System Holdings, Inc. 
Maruha Nichiro Holdings, Inc.

References

External links

 Yokohama BayStars official website

 
Nippon Professional Baseball teams
DeNA
DeNA franchises
Baseball teams established in 1950
Sports teams in Yokohama
1950 establishments in Japan